Pycnochromis amboinensis, the Ambon chromis, is a damselfish from the Western Pacific. It occasionally makes its way into the aquarium trade.

References

External links
 

amboinensis
Fish of the Pacific Ocean
Fish described in 1871